Platygillellus is a genus of sand stargazers native to the Atlantic and Pacific coasts of the Americas.

Species
There are currently six recognized species in this genus:
 Platygillellus altivelis C. E. Dawson, 1974 (Sailfin stargazer)
 Platygillellus brasiliensis Feitoza, 2002 (Brazilian sand stargazer)
 Platygillellus bussingi C. E. Dawson, 1974 (Bussing's stargazer)
 Platygillellus rubellulus (Kendall & Radcliffe, 1912) (Shortfin sand stargazer)
 Platygillellus rubrocinctus (Longley, 1934) (Saddle stargazer)
 Platygillellus smithi C. E. Dawson, 1982

References

 
Dactyloscopidae
Marine fish genera
Taxa named by Charles Eric Dawson